John Shelton (1884 – 7 September 1918) was an English footballer who played as a right-half and inside-forward. He was the elder brother of George Shelton. He played for Wolverhampton Wanderers in the 1908 FA Cup Final and later won minor cup competitions with Port Vale.

Career
Shelton was born in Wolverhampton in 1884 and played local football for Willenhall Pickwick and Crompton Rovers, before joining Wolverhampton Wanderers in 1907. The 1907–08 season was highly successful for Shelton, he scored a hat-trick against Grimsby Town in December, and scored against Bradford City in the FA Cup Third Round to earn Wolves a replay. The club went on to reach the 1908 FA Cup Final at the Crystal Palace National Sports Centre, and Shelton played in the 3–1 victory over Newcastle United. In total of scored 17 goals for the club in 94 appearances.

He joined Port Vale in August 1911, a club that had resigned from the Football League in 1907. He was an ever-present in his debut season and was a member of the sides that won the Staffordshire Senior Cup in 1912, the Birmingham Senior Cup in 1913, reached the FA Cup first round in 1914 and won the North Staffordshire Infirmary Cup in 1915. He guested for rivals Stoke during the war and made 26 appearances in 1915–16. He returned to Vale to become an ever-present in the 1916–17 season. He was conscripted into the North Staffordshire Regiment  in the summer of 1917 and was serving as a private with the 2nd Lincolnshire Regiment when he died near the Hindenburg Line in September 1918.

Personal life
Shelton married Sarah Nicholls in 1911, and the couple had two children: John (1912) and Sarah (1914). After Shelton's death, his wife went on to marry Jack Needham, his former teammate.

Career statistics

Honours
Wolverhampton Wanderers
FA Cup: 1907–08

Port Vale
Staffordshire Senior Cup: 1911–12
Birmingham Senior Cup: 1912–13
North Staffordshire Infirmary Cup: 1914–15

References

1884 births
1918 deaths
Footballers from Wolverhampton
English footballers
Association football wing halves
Association football inside forwards
Willenhall F.C. players
Wolverhampton Wanderers F.C. players
Port Vale F.C. players
Stoke City F.C. wartime guest players
English Football League players
Royal Lincolnshire Regiment soldiers
British Army personnel of World War I
North Staffordshire Regiment soldiers
British military personnel killed in World War I
FA Cup Final players
Military personnel from Staffordshire